Tusionite is a rare colorless to transparent to translucent yellow brown trigonal borate mineral with chemical formula: MnSn(BO3)2. The mineral is composed of 18.86% manganese, 40.76% tin, 7.42% boron, and 32.96% oxygen. It is a late stage hydrothermal mineral and occurs rarely in granite pegmatites in miarolitic cavities.

Tusionite was named for the location where the mineral was first discovered and described in 1983 in the Tusion River Valley in the Pamir Mountains of Tajikistan. Tusionite has also been reported from Recice in the Czech Republic and in pegmatites at Thomas Mountain, Riverside County, California.

See also

 Classification of minerals
 List of minerals

References

Tin minerals
Manganese minerals
Borate minerals
Trigonal minerals
Minerals in space group 148
Minerals described in 1983